The Alastor Cluster is the fictional setting of three of American writer Jack Vance's novels: Trullion: Alastor 2262 (1973), Marune: Alastor 933 (1975), and Wyst: Alastor 1716 (1978), each named after a world in the cluster. Vance planned a fourth novel Pharism: Alastor 458, but it was never written.

A globular star cluster Vance describes as "a whorl of thirty thousand live stars in an irregular volume twenty to thirty light-years in diameter," the Alastor Cluster is part of Vance's larger Gaean Reach fictional universe.

Three thousand of the star systems in the cluster are inhabited by five trillion humans. Vance describes them as having "little in common except their lack of uniformity." They are ruled by the mostly hands-off, laissez-faire Connatic, Oman Ursht, "the sixteenth of the Idite dynasty". His motto is "when in doubt, do nothing."

The Connatic's palace, Lusz, on the planet Numenes, rises "ten thousand feet above the sea on five great pylons", and contains chambers dedicated to each inhabited planet. His military force, the Whelm, is so-called for its use of overwhelming military force to accomplish victory.  In the manner of Harun al-Rashid of The Thousand and One Nights, he goes among his people in disguise: often acting under a pseudonym in the guise of an official of his own government. His character acts as a deus ex machina, linking the series of novels together.

A fourth authorised novel by Tais Teng, Phaedra: Alastor 824, was published under the "Paladins of Vance" label by Spatterlight Press in 2019.

References

External links 
 

1970s science fiction novels
1970s fantasy novels
Book series introduced in 1973
Science fiction book series
Fictional astronomical locations
Fictional regions
Novels set on fictional planets